The 720th Special Tactics Group is one of the special operations ground components of the 24th Special Operations Wing, assigned to Air Force Special Operations Command (AFSOC) of the United States Air Force. The group is headquartered at Hurlburt Field, Florida. The group is composed of geographically separated squadrons in five separate states; Florida, Georgia, New Mexico, North Carolina and Washington.

Overview
The Group's Special Tactics Squadrons are made up of Special Tactics Officers, Combat Controllers, Combat Rescue Officers, Pararescuemen, Special Reconnaissance, Air Liaison Officers, Tactical Air Control Party personnel, and a number of combat support airmen which comprise 58 Air Force specialties.

Special Tactics Squadrons are organized, trained and equipped specifically for various special operations missions facilitating air operations on the battlefield. They conduct combat search and rescue missions, perform battlefield surgery, collect intelligence, as well as call in close air support or airstrikes against enemy combatants and are often partnered with other U.S. special operations forces overseas.

Subordinate units

The 720th Special Tactics Group is assigned five special tactics squadrons and a support squadron.
17th Special Tactics Squadron at Ft. Benning, Georgia
21st Special Tactics Squadron at Pope Field, North Carolina
22nd Special Tactics Squadron at Joint Base Lewis-McChord, Washington
23rd Special Tactics Squadron at Hurlburt Field, Florida
26th Special Tactics Squadron at Cannon Air Force Base, New Mexico
720th Operations Support Squadron at Hurlburt Field, Florida

Other missions
The 720th STG also serves as the functional manager for two Special Tactics squadrons stationed outside the United States, the 320th Special Tactics Squadron under the 353d Special Operations Group at Kadena Air Base, Japan, and the 321st Special Tactics Squadron under the 352d Special Operations Wing at RAF Mildenhall, England.

There are two Air National Guard units that augments the 720th STG for training and deployments, the Kentucky Air National Guard's 123rd Special Tactics Squadron, based at Standiford Field, and the Oregon Air National Guard's 125th Special Tactics Squadron, based at Portland International Airport.

History
Prior to May 2014, special operations weather technicians were assigned to the 10th Combat Weather Squadron. The decision was made to integrate these technicians with the other special operators serving in the special tactics squadrons and the squadron was inactivated upon their transfer.

CHIEF Master Sergeant Aaron deployed from the group's 22d Special Tactics Squadron to Kandahar Province Afghanistan, was awarded the Air Force Cross for his actions on 10 December 2013.  CMSgt Aaron and two Army Special Forces teammates had become separated from the main friendly body of troops while infiltrating enemy territory.  The three were trapped in a courtyard by intense enemy fire that wounded CMSgt Aaron's two companions.  CMSgt Aaron sprinted from his position to the exposed position of the two wounded teammates to defend them. Aaron continued to fight the enemy alone until reinforcements arrived. Once they did, he dragged his teammates to a nearby position of concealment and administered life-saving trauma care.

Lineage
 Designated as the 1720th Special Tactics Group and activated on 1 October 1987
 Redesignated 720th Special Tactics Group on 31 March 1992.

Assignments
Twenty-Third Air Force (later Air Force Special Operations Command): 1 October 1987 – 12 June 2012
24th Special Operations Wing: 12 June 2012 – Present

Components
 10th Combat Weather Squadron: 1 August 1996 – 7 May 2014
 17th Air Support Operations Squadron (later 17th Special Tactics Squadron): 1 October 2008 – Present
 Ft. Benning, Georgia
 21st Special Tactics Squadron: 21 May 1996 – Present
 Pope Air Force Base (later Pope Field, North Carolina
 22d Special Tactics Squadron,  1 May 1996 – Present
 Joint Base Lewis-McChord, Washington
 1723d Special Tactics Squadron (later 23rd Special Tactics Squadron): unknown – Present
 1724th Special Tactics Squadron (later 24th Special Tactics Squadron): 1 October 1987 – 29 April 2011
 Pope Air Force Base (later Pope Field), North Carolina
 26th Special Tactics Squadron: 28 February 2014 – Present
 Kirtland Air Force Base, New Mexico
 720th Operations Support Squadron: 29 November 2004 – Present
 Special Tactics Training Squadron, 1 June 2008 – 1 October 2008

Stations
Hurlburt Field, Florida 1 Oct 1987–Present

Awards

Commanders
 October 1987 – May 1991, Col. John T. Carney
May 1991 – 1995, Col. Robert W. Neumann
1995 – 1997, Col. Craig F. Brotchie
1997 – July 1999, Col. James L. Oeser
July 1999 – July 2001, Col. Jeffrey Buckmelter
July 2001 – July 2002, Col. Robert H. Holmes
July 2002 – July 2004, Col. Craig D. Rith
July 2004 – August 2006, Col. Kenneth F. Rodriguez
 August 2006 – July 2008, Col. Marc F. Stratton
 July 2008 – June 2010, Col. Bradley P. Thompson
 June 2010 – June 2012, Col. Robert G. Armfield
 June 2012 – July 2014, Col. Kurt Buller

References

 Notes

External links
 

Military units and formations in Florida
Special tactics groups of the United States Air Force
1987 establishments in Florida